Telmatobius ceiorum is a species of frog in the family Telmatobiidae, and which is endemic to Argentina. Its natural habitats are subtropical or tropical moist montane forest and rivers, and it is threatened by habitat loss.

References

ceiorum
Amphibians of Argentina
Endemic fauna of Argentina
Taxa named by Raymond Laurent
Amphibians described in 1970
Taxonomy articles created by Polbot
Southern Andean Yungas